Langdale is a small community on the Sunshine Coast of southern British Columbia, Canada.  It is set in a verdant environment characteristic of many small BC communities. It plays host to a ferry terminal of the same name, which serves as the point of entry for most vehicles entering the Sunshine Coast region.  Langdale is part of West Howe Sound, Electoral Area F within the Sunshine Coast Regional District (SCRD) in British Columbia, Canada.

Langdale is a small residential community and has no significant industry other than the ferry terminal.

It is also the location of school district 46's Langdale Elementary School.

Located north of Langdale is the small community of Williamson's Landing.

The settlement is named after Robinson Henry Langdale (1835-1908) who preempted land on Langdale Creek in 1892.

Ferry terminal

The community's main feature is the BC Ferries terminal (Langdale Ferry Terminal) that links the Sunshine Coast to Vancouver via Horseshoe Bay, with connecting foot-passenger service to Keats Island and Gambier Island. While the terminal has two berths, only one operates fully as it has ramps for both the lower and higher-level ferry deck. The second berth operates as a dock for vessels not in service.

British Columbia Highway 101 is connected to this terminal through an off-ramp that leads to North Gibsons.

References

External links
www.Langdale-online.com Langdale website

Unincorporated settlements in British Columbia
Populated places in the Sunshine Coast Regional District